Horka is a municipality and village in Chrudim District in the Pardubice Region of the Czech Republic. It has about 400 inhabitants.

Administrative parts
Villages and hamlets of Hlína, Mezihoří and Silnice are administrative parts of Horka.

References

External links

Villages in Chrudim District